R566 road may refer to:
 R566 road (Ireland)
 R566 road (South Africa)